The 2021 ADAC Formula 4 Championship was the seventh season of the ADAC Formula 4, an open-wheel motor racing series. It was a multi-event motor racing championship that featured drivers competing in 1.4 litre Tatuus-Abarth single seat race cars that conformed to the technical regulations for the championship.

Teams and drivers

Race calendar and results 

The provisional calendar was released on 8 November 2020. Initially, all rounds were to support the 2021 ADAC GT Masters. The updated version was published on 6 December 2020. Other tweaks in the calendar in order to avoid clashes with the Italian counterpart, including moving forward the opening round to 24–25 April, were announced on 3 March 2021. Additionally, the first of two rounds in Hockenheim will be held separately from ADAC GT Masters. Due to the pandemic, the round at Motorsport Arena Oschersleben was postponed to 25–27 June and removed from the calendar eventually. The round at Nürburgring planned in early August was postponed after massive flooding in Germany. The new date was set to 5–7 November, making its the series finale.

Championship standings 
Points were awarded to the top 10 classified finishers in each race. No points were awarded for pole position or fastest lap. The final classification for the Drivers' Championship was obtained by summing up the scores on the 16 best results obtained during the races held.

Drivers' Championship

Rookies' Championship

Teams' Cup 
Only two best team's drivers in each race were eligible to score points. The other drivers were omitted during rewarding the points.

Notes

References

External links 

 

ADAC Formula 4 seasons
ADAC
ADAC Formula
ADAC Formula 4 Championship